Kätlin Valdmets is an Estonian beauty queen, model, who won the title of Miss Estonia in 2012.

References

Living people
1988 births
Estonian beauty pageant winners
Estonian female models
People from Tallinn
21st-century Estonian women